Symphoricarpos parishii, or Parish's snowberry, is a North American species of flowering plant in the honeysuckle family. It had been found in California, Nevada, Arizona, and Baja California.

Symphoricarpos parishii is a low spreading shrub. Stems are up to 100 cm (40 inches) long, sometimes leaning against other vegetation. Leaves are up to 2 cm (0.8 inch) long, dark green on the upper surface but lighter green underneath. It has pink, bell-shaped flowers and white fruits.

References

External links

parishii
Plants described in 1899
Flora of Baja California
Flora of the Western United States
Flora without expected TNC conservation status